Biyaz (Biäz) is a rural locality (a village) in Ozerkinsky Selsoviet, Karaidelsky District, Bashkortostan, Russia. The population was 174 as of 2010. There are 6 streets.

Geography 
Biyaz is located 53 km northeast of Karaidel (the district's administrative centre) by road. Krush is the nearest rural locality.

References 

Rural localities in Karaidelsky District